City of Westminster (Hanwell) Cemetery  is a cemetery located in Hanwell, Ealing, West London. It is owned and managed by the City of Westminster's Parks Service.

History
By the 1840s, the cemeteries of London were full and almost overflowing. The Bayswater Road Cemetery and St Mark's, North Audley Street were under the control of the St. George's Hanover Square Burial Board, who were unable to find a solution until the Metropolitan Interment Act of 1850 became law.

In 1853, the board purchased  in Hanwell for their exclusive use. Robert Jerrard was appointed as architect, who designed the church and administration buildings in a Victorian Gothic revival architecture style. Consecrated on 6 July 1854, by the Bishop of London Charles Blomfield, the total cost of cemetery and buildings was £14,741 17s 11d. The first interment took place on 2 August 1854.

In 1889, the cemetery was transferred to the Metropolitan Borough of the City of Westminster. The cemetery suffered extensive damage during World War Two, and at the end of the war in Europe a gift was given to the cemetery in the form of the renewal of the chapel's south side stained glass window, depicting a miscellany of some 30 biblical emblems.

In 1965, the cemetery came under new management in light of local government reorganisation. In 1987, the cemetery was one of three that Shirley Porter's Westminster City Council controversially sold to land developers for 15p. However, like East Finchley and Mill Hill, it was reacquired by the new City of Westminster in 1990, and renamed at that point  as their  Hanwell Cemetery. The council undertook extensive restoration of the central buildings in 1994, and in 2001 replaced the entire roof and cleaned the exterior walls, as well as making all provisions required under the Disability Discrimination Act.

War graves

There are 84 graves administered by the Commonwealth War Graves Commission – 55 from World War I and 29 from World War II – located throughout the cemetery. There is also a Royal British Legion memorial cross in the centre of the cemetery.

A number of people killed during World War II in air raids were buried temporarily during the conflict, and then reburied afterwards. 200 residents of the City of Westminster are remembered on the civilian memorial, located near the centre of the grounds. Unveiled in 1950, it houses the grave of popular singer Al Bowlly, who was killed at his flat in Jermyn Street during an air raid on 17 April 1941.

Transport links
The cemetery is well connected to London's transport network, with buses E3, E8, 83 and 207 stopping outside. The nearest London Underground stations are Ealing Broadway, Acton Town and Boston Manor. TfL Rail services stop at Hanwell station from London Paddington.

Notable interments
 Violet Bland (1863–1940), English Suffragette
 Al Bowlly, singer. Killed in The Blitz, buried in the mass grave in the centre of the grounds
 Marta Cunningham CBE, American soprano singer and philanthropist, founder of the Not Forgotten Association.
 Freddie Frinton, comedian
 Sir John Ackerman K.C.M.G, Mayor of Pietermaritzsburg
 Dr Robert Mortimer Glover, chloroform pioneer (unmarked grave)
 Ian Nairn, architectural critic and broadcaster
 Richard Bullen Newton, Paleontologist at the British Museum
 Col. Sir David Semple, First Director of Research India. Founder of the Pasteur Institute at Kasauli India.
 Sir John Hunt O.B.E, First Town Clerk of the City of Westminster
 The Rev Andrew Charles Albert McLaglen, son Fred Charles McLaglen and wife Lillian Marian McLaglen all relatives of 1935 Oscar winner Victor McLaglen.

See also
 Westminster cemeteries scandal

References

External links

 Hanwell Cemetery at the City of Westminster

Cemeteries in London
Anglican cemeteries in the United Kingdom
1853 establishments in England
Parks and open spaces in the London Borough of Ealing
Religion in the London Borough of Ealing
Hanwell